Dynamite Entertainment is an American comic book publisher founded in 2004 by Nick Barrucci in Mount Laurel, New Jersey, known for publishing comic book adaptations of licensed feature film properties, such as Army of Darkness, Terminator, and RoboCop; licensed or public domain literary properties such as Zorro, Dracula, Sherlock Holmes, Alice in Wonderland, Red Sonja, Tarzan, and John Carter of Mars; and superhero books including Project Superpowers, which revived classic public domain characters, and original creator-owned comics like The Boys.

Creators who have produced Dynamite's books include Alex Ross, John Cassaday, Matt Wagner, Garth Ennis, Howard Chaykin and Frank Miller. Dynamic Forces, a distribution of Dynamite's comics and books, announced a partnership with Diamond Distribution in 2008, when Diamond had the rights to publishing the international versions of books made by Dynamite Entertainment.

History
Dynamite Entertainment was founded by Nick Barrucci in 2004, initially publishing one comic: Army of Darkness, a miniseries it published through Devil's Due Publishing until it began self-publishing its own titles later that year. After devoting itself to publishing only Army of Darkness, which included a second miniseries, Dynamite published Red Sonja, starting with a 25-cent issue #0. It sold 240,000 copies. Issue #1 of Red Sonja, the first to sell at the full cover price of $2.99, sold 100,000 in initial orders, securing a stable position in the American comic book industry. By 2009, Dynamite was publishing 14–20 comic books and 2–10 collections per month.

Dynamite focuses primarily on comic book adaptations of licensed properties, such as Sherlock Holmes, The Lone Ranger, and Red Sonja. They also publish original books like Project Superpowers, and creator-owned comics like The Boys.  

Among its adaptations are those based on classic literature such as Alice in Wonderland, Dracula, and Zorro; television series such as Xena: Warrior Princess Battlestar Galactica, and Buck Rogers, and films such as Darkman, The Good, the Bad and the Ugly, RoboCop, Highlander, and the Terminator franchise.

Its film adaptations also include those of classic monsters such as Dracula, Dr. Jekyll & Mr. Hyde, Frankenstein's Monster, and the Wolfman.

The company gradully built its graphic novel program with titles like Howard Chaykin's American Flagg!, reprints of Marvel Comics' Red Sonja series, and material by other creators like Jim Starlin and Jae Lee. 

In addition to publishing crossover storylines in which characters from these various properties meet, such as Terminator/RoboCop, and Vampirella/Dracula: Unholy!, Dynamite has also produced intercompany crossover books with other publishers. One, titled "Monster War", was released through Image Comics in 2005, and consisted of several titles that pitted the classic monsters against Top Cow published characters Witchblade, the Darkness, Magdalena, and Tomb Raider. The other was a 2006 crossover between DC Comics' Red Sonja/Claw The Unconquered: Devil's Hands.

In February 2007, Dynamite Entertainment the publishing rights to Garth Ennis' creator-owned series The Boys after the book was cancelled six months into its run by DC Comics' WildStorm imprint. In July 2019, Sony Pictures Television and Amazon Studios premiered an adapted television series of The Boys for Amazon Prime Video after a brand licensing agreement was granted by Dynamite.

In 2009 Dynamite announced it would publish new comics featuring Lee Falk's The Phantom.

In 2010, Dynamite began publishing comic books based on The Green Hornet, beginning with a miniseries written by Kevin Smith and followed by Green Hornet: Year One, which was written by Matt Wagner, and another written by Brett Matthews.

In May 2010, Dynamite Entertainment acquired Chaos! Comics' library, which included and all of that publisher's associated assets, with the exception of Lady Death. Among these properties were the publishing labels Black Label Graphics, Infinity Comics, and the properties Evil Ernie, Smiley The Psychotic Button, Chastity, Purgatori, Jade, Omen, Bad Kitty, Cremator, Lady Demon.

In October 2013, Dynamite announced it would launch a line of comics based on titles originally published by Gold Key Comics, the first of which would be Magnus: Robot Fighter, The Occult Files of Doctor Spektor, Solar: Man of the Atom, and Turok.

In July 2016, author Andy Mangels stated in a New York Times interview that he was writing a new intercompany crossover mini-series for the company, in conjunction with DC Comics, Wonder Woman '77 Meets the Bionic Woman, which brought together the Lynda Carter television version of the Amazon superhero with Jaime Sommers, the cyborg super-heroine played by Lindsay Wagner  in the 1970s TV series, The Bionic Woman. The series was released in that December.

Titles
 Army of Darkness
 Battlestar Galactica
 Bettie Page
 The Boys
 Doc Savage
 Elvira
 Flash Gordon
 Green Hornet
 James Bond (see James Bond (Dynamite Entertainment))
 Kiss
 The Lone Ranger
 Project Superpowers
 Red Sonja
 RoboCop
 The Shadow
 Sherlock Holmes
 Terminator
 Vampirella/Dracula
 Xena: Warrior Princess

"Monster War" storyline
 Monster War: Magdalena vs. Dracula
 Hunter-Killer
 Witchblade and Tomb Raider
 Tomb Raider and the Darkness

References

General references

Inline citations

External links

 
 

 
2005 establishments in New Jersey
American companies established in 2005
Book publishing companies based in New Jersey
Comic book publishing companies of the United States
Companies based in Burlington County, New Jersey
Disney comics publishers
Mount Laurel, New Jersey
Publishers of adult comics
Publishing companies established in 2005